Vanessa Nsona is a Malawian fashion designer and entrepreneur best known as the creator of Fashion brand, Dorovee which is Malawi's first eco-friendly fashion accessory company. She designs hand made accessories including bags, shoes, bowties necklaces and other jewelry using Malawian fabric and materials. She launched the brand in 2012 in Malawi. Her designs have appeared in Malawi fashion shows, including Malawi Fashion Week 2014 and at the Malawi at 50 celebrations in Washington DC. An established designers in Malawi, she mentors and trains fashion designers both in and out of the country. She has co-hosted workshops in Malawi. In Zimbabwe, she held a workshop on 'Building a Sustainable Fashion Brand' together with Zedlabel at the US embassy. She is a member of Soroptmist International of Blantyre (SIB) which helps disadvantaged women and children. She also launched Project Luso, which  creates and promotes Malawian fashion designs to help disadvantaged women and mentors talent in the fashion industry together with non-profit Samaritan Trust.

Background
She holds a diploma in Business Management from University of Malawi. She was selected as a Mandela Washington Fellow under the Young African Leadership Initiative in Washington D.C. She represented Malawi at the African Youth World Heritage forum in Cape Town, South Africa.

Fashion shows
 Malawi Fashion Week 2014, Malawi
 Malawi at 50 Fashion Show, Washington DC 2015

Media appearances
Interviewee, "Executing a Business Idea", Player FM, Premier Multimedia Consultants, episode 003 & 004, 2016
Judge, Zedlabel Fashion Challenge, fashion feature TV show, Zimbabwe, 2015 
Interviewee, "Interview with Vanessa Nsona", United Nations Foundation, 2014

References

Living people
Malawian fashion designers
University of Malawi alumni
Alumni of Saint Andrews International High School
Year of birth missing (living people)